Digital economy rankings was published as a one-off exercise by the Economist Intelligence Unit as the follow-up to their previous e-readiness rankings. This was done to reflect the increasing influence of ICT in economic (and social) 
progress. The report was titled "Beyond e-readiness".

, the Economist has not published a follow up to the 2010 report, leaving it substantially outdated. A much more comprehensive and up-to-date index is the UN's ICT Development Index.

See also 
 e-Government
 Government Broadband Index
 ICT Development Index

References

Information economy
Digital divide
International rankings
Economist Intelligence Unit
IT infrastructure